Gerrie Deijkers (13 November 1946 – 29 October 2003) was a Dutch professional football player.

Career
Deijkers played at the beginning of his career at VV Baronie, NAC Breda, Willem II, AFC DWS and De Graafschap. He became the top scorer for Willem II in the Eerste Divisie in 1969–70 with 24 goals.

In 1973, trainer Kees Rijvers took Deijkers to PSV to join René van de Kerkhof, Willy van de Kerkhof and Ralf Edström. In the 1977–78 season, Deijkers became the club's top scorer with 18 goals to help PSV to win the league. Moreover, that was a successful year for Deijkers as he scored 8 times in the UEFA Cup tournament; the 1977–78 UEFA Cup won by PSV. Deijkers played six seasons for PSV, from 1973 to 1979, playing 170 matches scoring 35 goals.

Personal life
In 2003, Deijkers died from a heart attack. He is the father of techno producer Martyn.

Honours
PSV
 Eredivisie: 1974–75, 1975–76, 1977–78
 KNVB Cup: 1973–74, 1975–76
 UEFA Cup: 1977–78

Individual
 UEFA Cup Top Scorer: 1977–78
 Eredivisie Top Scorer: 1977–78

References

External links
 Rinie Maas (2016): 'Gerrie Deijkers and Nico Rijnders', Idols and Icons; The Nac Book, 62 Stories, p. 137-139. Rotterdam: Trichis Publishing.

1946 births
2003 deaths
Footballers from Breda
Association football fullbacks
Association football forwards
Dutch footballers
Eredivisie players
NAC Breda players
Willem II (football club) players
AFC DWS players
De Graafschap players
PSV Eindhoven players
SBV Vitesse players
UEFA Cup winning players